The 2018–19 Saint Louis Billikens women's basketball team represents the Saint Louis University during the 2018–19 NCAA Division I women's basketball season. The Billikens, led by seventh year head coach Lisa Stone, play their home games at the Chaifetz Arena and were members of the Atlantic 10 Conference. They finished the season 15–16, 9–7 in A-10 play to finish in sixth place. They advanced to the semifinals of the A-10 women's tournament where they lost to Duquesne.

Media
All non-televised Billikens home games and conference road games stream on the A-10 Digital Network.

Roster

Schedule

|-
!colspan=9 style=| Exhibition

|-
!colspan=9 style=| Non-conference regular season

|-
!colspan=9 style=| Atlantic 10 regular season

|-
!colspan=9 style=| Atlantic 10 Tournament

Rankings
2018–19 NCAA Division I women's basketball rankings

See also
 2018–19 Saint Louis Billikens men's basketball team

References

Saint Louis
Saint Louis Billikens women's basketball seasons